Linndale was a train station in Linndale, Ohio. The station was one of two locations where electric P Motor engines took over operations from steam engines pulling into Cleveland Union Terminal. The switch was necessary due to the city of Cleveland's ban on steam engines near the downtown area. The other station for engine switches was in the Cleveland neighborhood of Collinwood.

References

External links
Existing Railroad Stations in Cuyahoga County, Ohio

Railway stations in the United States opened in 1930
Railway stations closed in 1961
Transportation buildings and structures in Cuyahoga County, Ohio
Former railway stations in Ohio
Former New York Central Railroad stations